Admiral Sir Peter Charles Abbott  (12 February 1942 – 28 September 2015) was a Royal Navy officer and Vice-Chief of the Defence Staff of the United Kingdom.

Early life
Abbott was born on 12 February 1942. He was educated at St. Edward's School, Oxford before going on to Queens' College, Cambridge.

Military career
Abbott was commissioned into the Royal Navy in 1964. He commanded the minesweeper, from 1972 to 1975 and then joined the staff of the Senior Naval Officer in the West Indies.

He became commanding officer of the frigate  in 1976, second-in-command of the aircraft carrier  in 1980 and the Chief of Defence Staff's briefer during the Falklands War in 1982. He then became commanding officer of the frigate  as well as captain of the 1st Frigate Squadron in 1983.

He became Director of Navy Plans in 1985 and, having been promoted to rear admiral, he was appointed Flag Officer, Second Flotilla in 1989. He was made Assistant Chief of the Naval Staff in 1991 and, having been promoted to vice admiral, was appointed Deputy Supreme Allied Commander Atlantic in 1993. He became Commander-in-Chief Fleet and, having been promoted to admiral in 1995, he became Vice-Chief of the Defence Staff in 1997.

Later life
In retirement, Abbott was made Chairman of the Trustees of the Royal Naval Museum. He was also President of MSSC, governing charity of the Marine Society and the Sea Cadets.

He died of cancer on 28 September 2015.

Honours and decorations

References

|-

|-

|-

|-

1942 births
2015 deaths
Knights Grand Cross of the Order of the British Empire
Knights Commander of the Order of the Bath
Royal Navy admirals
Royal Navy personnel of the Falklands War
Officers of the Legion of Merit
Alumni of Queens' College, Cambridge
Deaths from cancer in England
Place of birth missing